Louis Fuzelier (also Fuselier, Fusellier, Fusillier, Fuzellier; 1672 or 1674 – 19 September 1752) was a French playwright.

Fuzelier was born and died in Paris. He wrote more than 200 plays for the Théâtre de la foire (theatres of the fair), alone or in collaboration with Alain-René Lesage, Alexis Piron or Jacques-Philippe d'Orneval.

Fuzelier wrote the libretto to Les Fêtes grecques et romaines, a ballet héroïque with music by François Colin de Blamont (1723) and to Les Indes galantes, an opéra-ballet with music by Jean-Philippe Rameau (1735), both performed in Paris at the Théâtre du Palais-Royal by the Académie Royale de Musique. Fuzelier also wrote some works for the Comédie-Française and was one of the principal editors of the Mercure de France, from 1721 to 1724 and from 1744 to 1752.

List of works

Académie royale de musique 
1713: Les Amours déguisés, ballet in one prologue and 3 entrées, music by Thomas-Louis Bourgeois 
1714: Arion, tragedy in music in one prologue and 5 acts, music by Jean-Baptiste Matho 
1718: Les Ages, ballet in one prologue and 3 entrées, music by André Campra
1723: Les Fêtes grecques et romaines, ballet héroïque in one prologue and 3 entrées, music by François Colin de Blamont
1725: La Reine des Péris, comédie persane in one prologue and 5 acts, music by Jacques Aubert 
1727: Les Amours des dieux, ballet héroïque in one prologue and 4 entrées, music by Jean-Joseph Mouret 
1729: Les Amours des déesses, ballet héroïque in one prologue and 3 entrées, music by Jean-Baptiste-Maurice Quinault 
1730: Le Caprice d'Erato ou les Caractères de la musique, one-act divertissement, music by François Colin de Blamont
1735: Les Indes galantes, ballet héroïque in one prologue and 4 entrées, music by Jean-Philippe Rameau
1744: L'Ecole des amants, ballet in one prologue et 3 entrées, music by Jean-Baptiste Niel
1749: Le Carnaval du Parnasse, ballet héroïque in one prologue and 3 entrées, music by Jean-Joseph Cassanéa de Mondonville

Comédie-Française 
1713: Cornélie Vestale, tragédie (1713)
1719: Momus fabuliste ou les Noces de Vulcain, one-act comedy, music by Jean-Baptiste-Maurice Quinault (1719)
1725: Les Amusements de l'automne, divertissement in one prologue and 2 acts
1727: Les Amazones modernes (with Marc-Antoine Legrand), three-act comedy
1732: Le Procès des sens, one-act comedy

Comédie Italienne 
1718: La Mode, prologue, music by Jean-Joseph Mouret 
1718: L'Amour maître de langues, comedy, music by Jean-Joseph Mouret 
1718: La Fée Mélusine, three-act comedy, music by Jean-Joseph Mouret 
1719: La Rupture du Carnaval et de la Folie, parody 
1721: Hercule filant, parody
1722: Les Noces de Gamache, comedy, music by Jean-Joseph Mouret 
1722: Le Vieux monde, ou Arlequin somnambule, comedy in one prologue and one act, music by Jean-Joseph Mouret 
1722: Arlequin Persée, parody
1723: Le Serdeau des théâtres, one-act comedy
1723: La Parodie 
1723: Les Saturnales, parody 
1723: Les Débris des Saturnales 
1724: Amadis le cadet, parody, music by Jean-Joseph Mouret 
1725: Momus exilé, ou les Terreurs paniques, parody, music by Jean-Joseph Mouret 
1725: L'Italienne française (with Biancolelli and Romagnesi), comedy in one prologue and 3 acts, music by Jean-Joseph Mouret 
1726: La Bague magique, one-act comedy, music by Jean-Joseph Mouret

Théâtre de la Foire 
1701: Thésée ou la Défaite des Amazones, divertissement mingled with humorous intermeds, Foire Saint-Laurent, Jeu des Victoires, Troupe de Bertrand
1705: Le Ravissement d'Hélène, le siège et l'embrasement de Troie, Foire Saint-Germain, Troupe de Bertrand
1710: Arlequin et Scaramouche vendangeurs, divertissement, Foire Saint-Laurent, Grand jeu du préau
1711: Apollon à la Foire, divertissement muet, Foire Saint-Germain, Jeu de Paume d'Orléans
1711: Jupiter curieux impertinent, divertissement, Foire Saint-Germain, Troupe d'Allard et Lalauze
1711: Scaramouche pédant, divertissement, Foire Saint-Laurent, Troupe de Dolet et La Place
1711: Orphée ou Arlequin aux enfers, divertissement, Foire Saint-Laurent, Troupe de Dolet et La Place
1711: Arlequin Enée ou la prise de Troie, comedy in one prologue and 3 acts, Foire Saint-Laurent, Grand jeu du préau, Pantomimes 
1714: La Matrone d'Ephèse, Foire Saint-Germain, Troupe de la Veuve Baron
1715: Arlequin défenseur d'Homère, one-act play, Foire Saint-Laurent
1717: Pierrot furieux ou Pierrot Roland, parody, Foire Saint-Germain, Jeu de Paume d'Orléans, Troupe de la Veuve Baron
1718: Les Animaux raisonnables (with Marc-Antoine Legrand), one-act opéra comique, Foire Saint-Germain
1721: Arlequin Endymion (with Alain-René Lesage and Jacques-Philippe d'Orneval), Foire Saint-Germain, Troupe de Francisque
1722: L'Ombre du cocher poète (with Alain-René Lesage and Jacques-Philippe d'Orneval), prologue, Foire Saint-Germain, Marionnettes
1722: Le Rémouleur d'amour (with Alain-René Lesage and Jacques-Philippe d'Orneval), one-act play, Foire Saint-Germain, Marionnettes
1722: Pierrot Romulus ou le Ravisseur poli (with Alain-René Lesage and Jacques-Philippe d'Orneval), parody, Foire Saint-Germain, Marionnettes
1724: Les Vacances du théâtre, one-act opéra comique, Foire Saint-Germain
1725: L'Audience du Temps ou l'Occasion, prologue, Foire Saint-Germain
1725: PIerrot Pierrette, opéra comique, Foire Saint-Germain
1725: Les Quatre Mariamnes, opéra comique, Foire Saint-Germain
1732: La Réconciliation des sens, one-act play, Foire Saint-Laurent, Opéra-Comique
1729: L'Enfer galant, parody, Foire Saint-Laurent
1733: Le Trompeur trompé, parody, Foire Saint-Germain
1744: Polichinelle maître d'école, parody, Foire Saint-Laurent

Bibliography

Plays by Fuzelier 
 Parodies du Nouveau Théâtre Italien, Paris, Briasson, 1738, 4 vol. Contient une défense des parodies, sous le titre Discours à l'occasion d'un discours de M. D. L. M. (vol. 1), et neuf des parodies de Fuzelier, dont La Rupture du Carnaval et de la Folie (1719), Hercule filant chez Omphale (1721), Arlequin Persée (1722), Le Serdeau des théâtres (1723), La Parodie, tragi-comédie (1723), Amadis le cadet (1724) et Momus exilé ou les terreurs paniques (1725).
 Les manuscrits BnF fr. 9332, 9333, 9335, 9336 et 9337 sont consacrés au « théâtre inédit de Fuzelier », et contiennent environ 75 pièces écrites seul ou en collaboration.
 La Grand-mère amoureuse, parodie d'Atys, a Marionnette parody of Lully's Atys by Louis Fuzelier dans Dorneval from 1726, éd. Susan Harvey, Middleton, A-R Éditions, 2008.
 Théâtre de la foire : anthologie de pièces inédites, 1712-1736, dir. Françoise Rubellin, Montpellier, Espaces 34, 2005, . Cet ouvrage contient entre autres deux pièces de Fuzelier : La Matrone d'Éphèse et Pierrot furieux ou Pierrot Roland.

Literature on Fuzelier and his plays 
 Gustave Vapereau, Dictionnaire universel des littératures, Paris, Hachette, 1876, 
 David Trott, « Pour une histoire des spectacles non officiels : Louis Fuzelier et le théâtre à Paris en 1725-1726 », Revue d'Histoire du Théâtre, 1985. 3, . 
 David Trott, « Deux visions du théâtre: la collaboration de Lesage et Fuzelier au répertoire forain », Lesage, écrivain (1695-1735), éd. Jacques Wagner, Amsterdam, Rodopi, 1997, .
 David Trott, « A Dramaturgy of the unofficial stage: the non-texts of Louis Fuzelier », L'Âge du théâtre en France / The Age of Theatre in France, éd. David Trott & Nicole Boursier, Edmonton, Academic Printing and Publishing, 1988, .
 David Trott, « Textes et réécritures de textes : le cas des Fêtes grecques et romaines de Louis Fuzelier », Man and Nature / L'Homme et la Nature, vol. III, Edmonton, Academic Printing and Publishing, 1984, .
 David Trott, « Louis Fuzelier et le théâtre: vers un état présent », Revue d'Histoire littéraire de la France, vol. 83, no. 4 (juillet-août 1983), .
 Françoise Rubellin, « Stratégies parodiques à la Foire et aux Italiens : le dénouement d'Atys de Lully et Quinault », Le Théâtre en musique et son double (1600-1762), actes du colloque L'Académie de musique, Lully et la parodie de l'opéra réunis par D. Gambelli et L. Norci Cagiano, Paris, Champion, 2005, .
 Françoise Rubellin (dir.), Théâtre de la foire : anthologie de pièces inédites, 1712-1736, Montpellier, Espaces 34, 2005, .
 Françoise Rubellin, « Écrire pour tous les théâtres : le cas singulier de Louis Fuzelier », dans L'Opéra de Paris, la Comédie-Française et l'Opéra-Comique (1672-2010): approches comparées, dir. Sabine Chaouche, Denis Herlin et Solveig Serre, Paris, Études et rencontres de l’École des Chartes, 2012, .

References

External links 
 Louis Fuselier on Data.bnf.fr
 List of works
 Article Louis Fuzelier on Dictionnaire des journalistes (1600–1789).

Writers from Paris
1672 births
1752 deaths
18th-century French dramatists and playwrights
18th-century French poets
French ballet librettists
French opera librettists
French chansonniers
18th-century French male writers
French male dramatists and playwrights
French male poets